Idris Waziri (b 1952) is a Nigerian politician and business executive.

Biography 
Waziri gained a degree at Ahmadu Bello University, Zaria. He then joined the government as an administrative officer.  He became a Permanent Secretary and then Commissioner of Finance, Commerce and Industry, and retired in 1993. to work in the private sector.

He was a founding member of the People's Democratic Party (PDP) In 1999, President Olusegun Obasanjo appointed him Nigerian Ambassador to Pakistan.
He was appointed as Minister of Commerce in July 2003 and resigned in June 2006 to contest the 2007 gubernatorial elections of Taraba state.

Waziri ran unsuccessfully for the Governor of Taraba state in 2007,in 2013 he was chosen by Dan-Baba Suntai then Governor of Taraba state to run for PDP National Chairman.

In 2021, he was appointed by the Governor of Taraba state Arc Darius Dickson Ishaku as the Chairman of the governing council, Taraba state university. 

During his tenure as commerce minister, Waziri was known for his enthusiasm for exporting cassava.

References

1952 births
Living people
Federal ministers of Nigeria
Taraba State Peoples Democratic Party politicians
High Commissioners of Nigeria to Pakistan
Ahmadu Bello University alumni